Endoplasmic reticulum resident protein 44 (ERp44) also known as thioredoxin domain-containing protein 4 (TXNDC4) is a protein that in humans is encoded by the ERP44 gene.

Interactions 

TXNDC4 has been shown to interact with ERO1L.

References

Further reading 

 
 
 
 
 
 
 
 
 

Endoplasmic reticulum resident proteins